Allison Munn (born October 7, 1974) is an American actress. She played Caroline Dupree in the Fox sitcom That '70s Show, Tina Haven in The WB sitcom What I Like About You, Lauren in The WB/CW drama One Tree Hill, and Anne Harper on the Nickelodeon series Nicky, Ricky, Dicky & Dawn.

Early life
Munn was born and raised in Columbia, South Carolina. Her father was Russell Munn, a political lobbyist. Munn graduated from AC Flora High School and The College of Charleston. She moved to New York, where she won a role in the Off-Broadway classic The Fantasticks.

Career
Munn followed her stage roles with small roles in White Oleander, the film adaptation of  the Janet Fitch novel of the same name, opposite Alison Lohman, Michelle Pfeiffer, Robin Wright-Penn and Renée Zellweger, and in Cameron Crowe's romantic tragicomedy Elizabethtown opposite Orlando Bloom and Kirsten Dunst.

In September 2003, Munn won a co-starring role opposite Amanda Bynes and Jennie Garth in the second season of The WB sitcom What I Like About You as Tina Haven, Holly Tyler's new best friend.  Although their characters were the same age, Munn is eleven-and-a-half years older than her co-star Bynes. Munn remained on the show until the show ended with the fourth season on April 24, 2006. Munn also had a recurring role as Caroline, Fez's borderline stalker girlfriend on the Fox sitcom That '70s Show.

Munn co-starred as Cindy in the short-lived ABC sitcom Carpoolers that ran from October 2, 2007, to March 4, 2008. In 2009, Munn began a recurring role on The WB drama One Tree Hill playing Lauren, Jamie Scott's teacher who begins to date Skills Taylor at the end of the sixth season.

From 2014 to 2018, Munn co-starred opposite Brian Stepanek as Anne Harper, the mother of the titular quadruplets in Nickelodeon sitcom Nicky, Ricky, Dicky & Dawn.

In 2017, Munn joined her former One Tree Hill castmates in signing a letter of support for one of the show's writers, who had accused One Tree Hills showrunner of sexual harassment.

Personal life
Munn began dating her childhood friend, actor Scott Holroyd, in 2004. They became engaged in Paris in December 2006 and married on November 17, 2007, at the French Huguenot Church in Charleston, South Carolina. They reside in Los Angeles with their pet terrier, Buster Keaton. In November 2011 Munn announced the birth of their son via her Twitter. She gave birth to their daughter in 2015.

Political activism
Munn lends her name and support to the non-profit political organization Rock the Vote, where she is actively involved in encouraging young people to register to vote.

Filmography

Film

Television

References

External links

1974 births
American film actresses
American television actresses
Living people
Actresses from Columbia, South Carolina
College of Charleston alumni
20th-century American actresses
21st-century American actresses
A.C. Flora High School alumni